Hutton Mulgrave is a village and civil parish in the Scarborough
district of North Yorkshire, England.

According to the 2001 UK census, Hutton Mulgrave parish had a population of 48. The population remained at less than 100 as at the 2011 Census. Details are included in the civil parish of Ugthorpe.

References

External links

Villages in North Yorkshire
Civil parishes in North Yorkshire